Xiao Sijin was a Chinese diplomat. He was Ambassador of the People's Republic of China to Mozambique (1989–1993) and Angola (1995–1999).

References

Ambassadors of China to Mozambique
Ambassadors of China to Angola
Living people
Year of birth missing (living people)